Podoué (also spelled Podwé and Poday) is a village in southwestern Ivory Coast. It is in the sub-prefecture of Grabo, Tabou Department, San-Pédro Region, Bas-Sassandra District.

Podoué was a commune until March 2012, when it was one of 1,126 communes nationwide that were abolished.

Notes

Former communes of Ivory Coast
Populated places in Bas-Sassandra District
Populated places in San-Pédro Region